Kiron may refer to:

Kiron, Iowa, small city in Crawford County, Iowa, United States
Kiron Lenses
Kiron, Alberta, a locality in Camrose County, Alberta, Canada
Kiron Skinner (born 1961), American political writer
Old Kiron, Iowa, ghost town, United States

See also
Chiron (disambiguation)
Chyron (disambiguation)